Gigi Fernández and Robin White  were the defending champions, but chose not to participate not to participate. Betsy Nagelsen and Gabriela Sabatini won the title, defeating Helen Kelesi and Raffaella Reggi in the finals, 3–6, 6–2, 6–2.

Seeds 
The top four seeds received a bye to the second round.

Draw

Finals

Top half

Bottom half

References

External links 
 ITF tournament edition details

Virginia Slims of Chicago
Canadian Open (tennis)
Canadian Open
Canadian Open
Canadian Open